Potassium voltage-gated channel, shaker-related subfamily, member 5, also known as KCNA5 or Kv1.5, is a protein that in humans is encoded by the KCNA5 gene.

Function 

Potassium channels represent the most complex class of voltage-gated ion channels from both functional and structural standpoints. KCNA5 encodes a member of the potassium channel, voltage-gated, shaker-related subfamily. This member contains six membrane-spanning domains with a shaker-type repeat in the fourth segment. It belongs to the delayed rectifier class, the function of which could restore the resting membrane potential of beta cells after depolarization, thereby contributing to the regulation of insulin secretion. This gene is intronless, and the gene is clustered with genes KCNA1 and KCNA6 on chromosome 12. Mutations in this gene have been related to both atrial fibrillation and sudden cardiac death. KCNA5 are also key players in pulmonary vascular function, where they play a role in setting the resting membrane potential and its involvement during hypoxic pulmonary vasoconstriction.

Interactions 

KCNA5 has been shown to interact with DLG4, PDZ domain-containing proteins such as SAP97, and Actinin, alpha 2.

See also 
 Voltage-gated potassium channel

References

Further reading

External links 
 
 

Ion channels